The Battle of Lingga was a naval engagement that took place in 1525 and in which Portuguese forces defeated a fleet belonging to the Sultan of Bintan (former sultan of Malacca) and the Sultan of Indragiri, in defense of an ally, the Sultan of Lingga.

Context
When the Portuguese governor of India Afonso de Albuquerque captured the great Malay city of Malacca, its ruler Sultan Mahmud fled with his remaining forces to Bintan, which he usurped from the native ruler. He built a new city there, rallied several states in the region against the Portuguese and continuously harassed Malacca by land and sea.

When the Sultan of Lingga revolted against the suserainty Sultan Mahmud however, he promptly allied with the Portuguese, and ships from Lingga could often be found in Malacca acquiring weapons and selling foodstuffs.

Sultan Mahmud persuaded his son-in-law the Sultan of Draguim (Indragiri) in Sumatra to blockade Lingga with his fleet. It was joined by Mahmuds own fleet commanded by his admiral, once it returned from a failed raid on Malacca, the two fleets numbering 160 oarships.

The Sultan of Lingga had already requested support from the Portuguese, and the captain of Malacca Jorge de Albuquerque dispatched two small carracks with 80 soldiers  to his aid, under the command of Baltasar Rodrigues Raposo and Álvaro de Brito.

Battle
The Portuguese anchored behind a few islands "a shot of falcão away from the island of Linga" seeking to hide their presence from the hostile fleet blockading Lingga, however they were spotted by a vessel keeping watch. The following morning, a small craft was spotted sounding the depths of the waters around the carracks, and realizing the enemy fleet would soon be upon them, the Portuguese made ready for battle: they tied both ships together, replaced the anchor ropes for chains so they wouldn't be cut; readied the arquebuses, artillery and the gunpowder bombs which they had brought in abundance; and finally set up pavises and purposely-made long bamboo mats over the rigging down to the sides of the ships so enemy grappling hooks would slide off if they attempted to board.

Shortly before midday, the two Portuguese vessels where attacked by the large enemy fleet, which advanced resolutely divided in two squadrons, draped in banners and making deafening noise with their war instruments and the shouting of the crews. However, the large and compact mass of shallow, open-topped vessels made for an ideal target for Portuguese artillery: 12 were sunk or disabled by the first salvo. As the Portuguese shouted Vitória, Vitória, they fired their arquebuses, while the Malays released poisoned arrows and fired their artillery; finally, once they were a stones-throw away, the Malays were subjected to a hail of bombs, costing them a further 17 vessels. 

An accident involving the handling of the bombs caused the mizzen of one of the Portuguese carracks to catch fire; at this critical moment, a number of Malay vessels grappled the ship from its stern sector and managed to enter through the gun-ports on each side of the rudder, but they were killed or forced out. A deadly close-range salvo from the stern guns decisively broke the morale of the Malays, causing them to scatter against the wishes of their commanders.

After the battle, the Portuguese found to have sunk or disabled about 80 vessels, and estimated the Malays dead at 600. The following morning they were met by the Sultan of Lingga in person, and were escorted to his city for long festivities held in their honor.

See also
Portuguese Malacca
Portuguese conquest of Malacca
Siege of Bintan

References 

Lingga
Lingga (1525)
Lingga
1525 in the Portuguese Empire